The Biter Bitten is a TVB modern adventure series broadcast in March 2006.

The story takes place in a circus and shot in Panyu, China.

Synopsis
 A treasure is hidden inside a circus.
 One step closer to the treasure; one step closer to danger.

This series is about the four close friends and their family looking for a buried treasure from the "Ten Tigers". They go through a lot of clues to lead them to new discoveries which all lead up to the big treasure. Jo Jun-Fung (Benny Chan) is the smart one that loves to solve riddles and answer IQ questions. Cheung Kin-Sing (Michael Tong) is Fung's best friend and both of them just arrived from America after studying.

As the series progresses, their love relationships become entangled causing misunderstandings and difficult times. Sing liked Lo Dan (Linda Chung) at first sight. Joey Chik Ho-Yee (Shirley Yeung) is annoyed with Fung and Sing and they always prank each other, But later she gradually grows a relationship for Fung. But Fung likes Dan and she likes him too, and Sing and Joey try to break them up through hilarious plans which backfire on them instead. They soon start to fall in love with each other. The four strive to get the treasure for historical purposes but little do they know, the deeper they go, the more trouble awaits them.

Cast

Viewership ratings

References

External links
TVB.com The Biter Bitten - Official Website 

TVB dramas
2006 Hong Kong television series debuts
2006 Hong Kong television series endings
Television shows set in Hong Kong